Sea lemon is a loosely applied common name for a group of medium-sized to large shell-less colorful sea slugs or nudibranchs, specifically dorid nudibranchs in the taxonomic family Dorididae and other closely related families. These are marine gastropod mollusks.

The Monterey sea lemon is Doris montereyensis and the mottled pale sea lemon is Diaulula lentiginosa.

The common name sea lemon probably comes from these animal's visual similarity to a lemon based on such qualities as the roughened skin, the oval form when seen from above, and the common but not inevitable orange to pale yellow coloration.

Description
These dorid nudibranchs can be large (up to 20 cm), rather flattened, and oval in shape when seen from above. They have two hornlike projections (rhinophores) on the head, and a rosette-like tuft of gills on the back of the animal. The mantle is sometimes sprinkled with black dots, and it is covered in small bumps, which are called tubercles.

Life habits
Sea lemons feed on sponges. They lay ribbons of white or yellow eggs. 
Taxonomically the Dorididae is a family of several genera, the dorids named after the mythological ancient Greek sea nymph Doris. (See Ovidius, Metamorphoses 2.6)

Genera
Genera within the family Dorididae include:
 Aphelodoris (Bergh, 1879)
 Artachaea Bergh, 1881 
 Conualevia Collier & Farmer, 1964
 Doriopsis Bergh, 1889
 Doris Linnaeus, 1758
 
 Goslineria Valdés, 2001
 Homoiodoris Bergh, 1881: nomen dubium
 Pharodoris Valdés, 2001
Genera brought into synonymy
 Anisodoris Bergh, 1898 : synonym of Diaulula (Discodorididae)
 Anoplodoris P. Fischer, 1883  : synonym of Doris Linnaeus, 1758
 Aporodoris Ihering, 1886 [synonym of Taringa in family Discodorididae]
 Archidoris Bergh, 1878 : synonym of Doris Linnaeus, 1758
 Austrodoris Odhner, 1926 : synonym of Doris Linnaeus, 1758
 Ctenodoris Eliot, 1907 : synonym of Doris Linnaeus, 1758
 Doridigitata d'Orbigny, 1839: synonym of Doris Linnaeus, 1758
 Doriopsis Bergh, 1889: synonym of Doris Linnaeus, 1758
 Doriorbis Kay & Young, 1969 :synonym of Doris Linnaeus, 1758
 Etidoris Ihering, 1886 a: synonym of Thordisa Bergh, 1877
 Guyonia Risbec, 1928 :synonym of Doris Linnaeus, 1758
 Neodoris Baba, 1938 : synonym of Doris Linnaeus, 1758
 Praegliscita Burn, 1957  : synonym of Doris Linnaeus, 1758
 Rhabdochila P. Fischer, 1883: synonym of Rostanga Bergh, 1879
 Siraius Marcus, 1955 : synonym of Doris Linnaeus, 1758
 Staurodoris Bergh, 1878: synonym of Doris Linnaeus, 1758

References

 
Taxa named by Constantine Samuel Rafinesque